David Robert Warner (born 1953) is an Australian rock musician, author and screenwriter. He lives in Sydney with his wife and three children.

Biography
Dave Warner was born David Robert Warner in Bicton, Western Australia in 1953.  He attended Aquinas College and then the University of Western Australia where he graduated with a B.A. (Hons.), majoring in psychology.

Musical works
In 1973, he formed the band Pus, which was influenced by radical 1960s New York activist band, The Fugs. Warner describes this band on his website as "Australia's first punk band". The term had been used in the 1960s, referring to "Garage Bands". The genre that became known as punk was not to emerge as an identifiable musical entity until the mid-1970s, and although Warner might have pre-empted punk "attitude" with Pus, musically it is unlikely from a very few witness accounts of this obscure outfit that the band's material could be categorised thus . Warner's song writing created his first version of "Suburban Boy" in 1976. He gained a wider popularity with his next band, From the Suburbs, which he formed in January 1977. The band gained an underground following and was subsequently signed by Mushroom Records.

As Dave Warner's From the Suburbs, they re-released "Suburban Boy" (1978) as a single and then Mugs Game (1978) with some tracks recorded live at Melbourne University, it was certified Gold within a month of its release. Free Kicks (1979) followed, but then From the Suburbs disbanded. With a new line-up, Warner released Correct Weight (1979) and This is My Planet (1981; reissued as This is Your Planet in 1996).

After This is My Planet, Warner diversified from writing and performing music full-time. Instead, he started to write plays, novels and screenplays.

Theatrical works
In 1982, his revue, The Sensational Sixties started to tour large suburban hotels. Written and produced by Warner, the show was successful. In 1985, Warner wrote and appeared in a musical, The Sixties and All That Pop. Later that year Planet Pres, a rock musical written by him, was produced by the WA Theatre Company, and performed at the Playhouse Theatre.

In 1987, Warner managed and wrote songs for a female trio, Pleasure Principle. He performed (and wrote) a one-man show, Australian Heroes. He had a small parts in the movies Boundaries of the Heart (1988) and Boys in the Island (1989).

Screen works
The first feature film written by Warner, Cut (2000), was a teen slasher starring Molly Ringwald and Kylie Minogue. He followed up with Balmain Boys (TV movie) and Garage Days (both 2002) and then Ravenswood (2006) starring Stephen Moyer and Teresa Palmer. He was one of the chief writers of the drama TV series Going Home and the short TV feature Roll, as well as writing more than ten episodes of McLeod's Daughters. Warner wrote in an episode of Packed to the Rafters that featured his single Suburban Boy in a storyline starring Craig McLachlan as a faded 1980s rock star.

Literary works
Warner has written both fiction and non-fiction. His first novel, a crime story called City of Light, was published in 1995. It was the winner of the Best Fiction Work award at the Western Australian Premier's Book Awards in 1996. In the same year his second book, Footy's Hall of Shame also came out, featuring cartoons by Steve Panozzo. In 1997, Warner's second crime novel, Big Bad Blood was published. He then wrote the first one in a series of humorous crime novels in the style of Agatha Christie, Murder in the Groove. Published in 1998, the book featured Andrew "The Lizard" Zirk, a former rock star turned detective. In the same year were also published Racing's Hall of Shame (co-written with Nicolas Brasch), Cricket's Hall of Shame (again with cartoons by Panozzo) and 25 Years of Mushroom Records. The second novel featuring "Lizard" Zirk, Murder in the Frame, was published in 1999. In 2000, Warner published eXXXpresso, a novel about an ex-criminal who intends to build a chain of prison-themed cafés, and Murder in the Off-Season, the third "Lizard" Zirk novel.

Bibliography

Fiction
Andrew "Lizard" Zirk series
 Murder in the Groove (1998)
 Murder in the Frame (1999)
 Murder in the Off-Season (2000)

Dan Clement and Snowy Lane series
 City of Light (1995)
 Before It Breaks (2015)
 Clear to the Horizon (2017)

Other works
 Big Bad Blood (1997)
 Great Australian Bites (edited by) (1997)
 eXXXpresso (2000)
River of Salt (2019)

Non-fiction

 Footy's Hall of Shame (1996)
 25 Years of Mushroom Records (1998) 
 Cricket's Hall of Shame (1998)
 Horseracing's Hall of Shame (1999)

Discography

Studio albums

Live albums

Compilation albums

EPs

Singles

Awards

West Australian Music Industry Awards
The West Australian Music Industry Awards are annual awards celebrating achievements for Western Australian music. They commenced in 1985.

|-
| 1992 || Dave Warner|| Rock 'n' Roll of Renown || 
|-

References

External links
 Dave Warner's home page
 
 
 Dave Warner's From The Suburbs mentioned in The Geeks Story

1953 births
Living people
Australian crime writers
People educated at Aquinas College, Perth
Australian male singers
Australian songwriters
Musicians from Perth, Western Australia
Australian male novelists